Malovodnoye is a village in the Chüy Region of Kyrgyzstan. Its population was 2,433 in 2021.

References

Populated places in Chüy Region